Carla Shelley (born 26 June 1965) is an English producer for Aardman Animations and Birdbox Studio.

She produced A Close Shave, Humdrum, Wallace & Gromit: The Curse of the Were-Rabbit, Arthur Christmas, and Early Man.

She was also a line producer for Chicken Run.

She was also an executive producer for The Pirates! In an Adventure with Scientists!, & A Shaun The Sheep Movie: Farmageddon

She was also a co-executive producer for Shaun the Sheep Movie.

External links

Living people
BAFTA winners (people)
1965 births
British film producers
British television producers
British women television producers
Aardman Animations people